Brachypterolus pulicarius, known generally as the toadflax flower-eating beetle or antirrhinum beetle, is a species of short-winged flower beetle in the family Kateretidae. It is found in Europe and Northern Asia (excluding China) and North America.

References

Further reading

External links

 

Kateretidae
Articles created by Qbugbot
Beetles described in 1758
Taxa named by Carl Linnaeus